

Thomas was a medieval Bishop of the East Angles. He was consecrated between 647 and 648. He died between 652 and 653. He was bishop for five years.

References

External links
 

Bishops of the East Angles